Any Time Now is a 2002 co-produced six-part comedy-drama by RTÉ and BBC Northern Ireland.

The show initially aired on BBC One Northern Ireland and RTÉ One in 2002. The show was filmed in Dublin, Republic of Ireland and Belfast, in Northern Ireland.

Concept

Anytime Now was an Irish contemporary six-part drama series, set against the backdrop of the newly thriving and cosmopolitan Dublin, about the lives, loves, and libidos of three lifelong friends. Nora Moggin (played by Angelina Ball), Kate O'Dowd (played by Zara Turner) and Stevie McCutcheon (played by Susan Lynch) live in Dublin. They have a combined age of 99. Between them they have slept with 47 men, broken 11 hearts, drunk approximately 5000 pints, bought one house, buried two parents, failed one marriage and produced one baby. They've known each other long enough to believe that their friendship, at least, is invincible

Cast
 Angeline Ball
 Susan Lynch
 Zara Turner
 Ciarán McMenamin (Johnny)
Frankie McCafferty (Declan Carthy)
Patrick O'Kane (Colin)
Owen Roe (Frank O'Halloran)
Brid Brennan (Emily Moggin)
Ruth McCabe (Margaret McCutcheon).

Theme Song
The theme song is "In These Shoes?" by Kirsty MacColl.

External links
 Any Time Now

Television shows from Northern Ireland
RTÉ original programming
2000s television series from Northern Ireland
2000s Irish television series